Katarzyna Czubak, married Dźwigalska (born 25 August 1985) is a Polish female professional basketball player.

External links
Profile at fibaeurope.com
Profile at eurobasket.com

1985 births
Living people
Sportspeople from Gorzów Wielkopolski
Polish women's basketball players
Shooting guards